Justice José Fernando Franco González-Salas  (born December 4, 1950) is a Mexican jurist who served as a minister of the National Supreme Court of Justice from 2006 to 2021.

President Vicente Fox  nominated him as a Minister (Associate Justice) of the Supreme Court to fill the vacancy left after the retirement of Juan Díaz Romero in November 2006. González Salas was confirmed by the Senate with 94 votes on December 12, 2006. His term ended on December 11, 2021.

References

Living people
1950 births
20th-century Mexican lawyers
Supreme Court of Justice of the Nation justices
21st-century Mexican judges